The Pilbara death adder (Acanthophis wellsi), also known commonly as Wells' death adder, is a species of venomous snake in the family Elapidae. The species is one of the eight members of the genus Acanthophis, a genus which is found throughout northwestern and southwestern Australia and some parts of southern Papua New Guinea. The species Acanthophis wellsi is endemic to Western Australia.

Taxonomy
The Pilbara death adder was described by Raymond Hoser in 1998. The specific name, wellsi, is in honor of Australian herpetologist Richard Walter Wells.

Description
Dorsally, A. wellsi is usually brick red, with narrow, close-spaced gray crossbands. Individuals called "melanistic" have a black head, and the crossbands, which are wider, are yellowish brown, edged with black.

Distribution and habitat
Acanthophis wellsi is found in the Hamersley Range and the Chichester Range in the Pilbara region in northern Western Australia.

Habitat
The preferred natural habitats of A. wellsi are grassland, shrubland, and rocky areas.

Reproduction
Acanthophis wellsi is viviparous.

References

Further reading
Cogger HG (2014). Reptiles and Amphibians of Australia, Seventh Edition. Clayton, Victoria, Australia: CSIRO Publishing. xxx + 1,033 pp. . (Acanthophis wellsei, p. 859).

Wilson, Steve; Swan, Gerry (2013). A Complete Guide to Reptiles of Australia, Fourth Edition. Sydney: New Holland Publishers. 522 pp. . 

Acanthophis
Reptiles described in 1998
Reptiles of Western Australia
Snakes of Australia